Krisharao Gulabrao Deshmukh (8 March 1922 – 24 October 1992) was an Indian politician who was a member of the 1st, 4th and 5th Lok Sabha of India from  the Amravati constituency of Maharashtra, and a member of 2nd Lok Sabha from Ramtek. He was a member of the Indian National Congress (INC) political party. 

Deshmukh studied at Hislop College and College of Law at Nagpur. He was married to Ashadevi and had two sons and 4 daughters and resides at Amravati.

He worked in various capacities in Vidarbha Pradesh, including the Congress Committee, Maharashtra Pradesh Congress Committee and the A.I.C.C.

Deshmukh died on 24 October 1992, at the age of 70.

References

External links
 Official biographical sketch in Parliament of India website

1922 births
1992 deaths
India MPs 1971–1977
India MPs 1967–1970
India MPs 1957–1962
India MPs 1952–1957
Marathi politicians
People from Amravati district
Lok Sabha members from Maharashtra
People from Nagpur district
Indian National Congress politicians from Maharashtra